The Romance of Lady Hamilton is a 1919 British historical drama film directed by Bert Haldane and starring Malvina Longfellow, Humberston Wright and Cecil Humphreys. It follows the love affair between the British Admiral Horatio Nelson and Lady Emma Hamilton during the Napoleonic Wars.

Cast
 Malvina Longfellow as Emma Hamilton
 Humberston Wright as Horatio Nelson
 Cecil Humphreys as Charles Greville
 Jane Powell as Irene Greville
 Teddy Arundell as Prince of Wales
 Barbara Gott as Mrs Kelly
 Frank Dane as King of Naples
 Maud Yates as Queen of Naples
 Will Corrie as Featherstonehaugh
 Irene Tripod as Mrs Budd

References

Bibliography
 Sue Parrill. Nelson's Navy in Fiction and Film: Depictions of British Sea Power in the Napoleonic Era. McFarland, 2009.

External links

1919 films
Films directed by Bert Haldane
1910s historical drama films
British historical drama films
Films set in London
Films set in Naples
Films set in the 1800s
British silent feature films
Cultural depictions of Horatio Nelson
Cultural depictions of Emma, Lady Hamilton
British black-and-white films
1919 drama films
1910s English-language films
1910s British films
Silent historical drama films